Åsgardfonna is a glacier in Ny-Friesland on Spitsbergen, between Wijdefjorden and Lomfjorden. It is named after Åsgard in Norse mythology. Earlier names of the glacier are Åsgårdfonna and Névé dôme Asgård.

References

Glaciers of Spitsbergen